Firefight is the third album by Canadian melodic death metal band Blackguard, due on March 29, 2011 via Victory Records. Unlike its predecessor, this album contains elements of power metal and symphonic metal based on the band's melodic death metal root, much like in Children of Bodom's vein.

Track listing
All songs written by Paul "Ablaze" Zinay and Kim Gosselin, except noted.

Personnel
Blackguard
 Paul "Ablaze" Zinay – lead vocals
 Kim Gosselin - lead guitar, orchestrations
 Terry "Roadcase" Deschenes – rhythm guitar
 Étienne Mailloux – bass guitar
 Justine "Juice" Ethier – drums, percussion

References 

http://www.allmusic.com/album/firefight-r2138429
http://www.alterthepress.com/2011/04/album-review-blackguard-firefight.html
http://thepiratebay.org/torrent/6202550
http://www.last.fm/music/Blackguard
http://www.metalunderground.com/reviews/details.cfm?releaseid=4897
http://www.spirit-of-metal.com/album-groupe-Blackguard-nom_album-Firefight-l-en.html
http://allmetalresource.com/2011/03/10/review-blackguard-firefight-2011/
Blackguard's own words

2011 albums
Blackguard (band) albums